Girls Just Wanna Have Fun! is a studio album by the Irish all-girl pop band The Nolans. Released in 1984 through Towerbell Records and Mercury Records, the album consists of cover medleys totaling to 33 songs.

The album peaked at No. 39 on the UK Albums Chart and sold over 60,000 copies.

Track listing

References

External links
 

The Nolans albums
1984 albums
Covers albums
Mercury Records albums